Mak Hee Chun (born 28 August 1990) is a Malaysian badminton player and represented Hong Kong since 2016.

Career 
He started his career as a junior player by reaching the semi-final round and winning bronze in the boys' doubles event at the BWF World Junior Championships in 2006 and 2007 with Lim Khim Wah. Partnered with Teo Kok Siang, he won gold in 2008. He also won bronze in the mixed doubles event with Vivian Hoo Kah Mun. At the 2008 Asia Junior Championships, he won gold in the boys' doubles teamed-up with Teo.

In 2009, he reached the final of the Malaysia International Challenge and became the runner-up in the mixed doubles event with Ng Hui Lin. At the same year, he reached the semi-final at the Malaysia Open Grand Prix Gold tournament in the men's doubles event partnered with Tan Wee Kiong. In September 2012, he dropped from the Badminton Association of Malaysia (BAM), and then started to play as an independent player. In 2014, he  won the men's doubles title at the Malaysia National Circuit Grand Prix Finals with Tan Bin Shen.

In early 2015, he was recalled to join Malaysia national badminton team in order to strengthen the men's doubles department. But, in August 2015, he immediately resigned from the BAM due his performance with his partner in the men's doubles Teo Kok Siang unsatisfactory.

In 2016, he started to representing Hong Kong at the international tournament, and at the National Championships, he was the men's and mixed doubles runner-up partnered with Yeung Shing Choi and Tse Ying Suet respectively. In 2017, he won the mixed doubles title at the Tata Open India International Challenge tournament with Yeung Nga Ting.

Achievements

BWF World Junior Championships 
Boys' doubles

Mixed' doubles

Asian Junior Championships 
Boys' doubles

BWF International Challenge/Series 
Men's doubles

Mixed doubles

  BWF International Challenge tournament
  BWF International Series tournament

References

External links 
 

1990 births
Living people
People from Perak
Malaysian sportspeople of Chinese descent
Malaysian male badminton players
Badminton players at the 2010 Asian Games
Asian Games competitors for Malaysia
Southeast Asian Games silver medalists for Malaysia
Southeast Asian Games bronze medalists for Malaysia
Southeast Asian Games medalists in badminton
Competitors at the 2011 Southeast Asian Games
Competitors at the 2015 Southeast Asian Games
Hong Kong male badminton players